XRR or xrr may refer to:

 X-ray reflectivity, a surface-sensitive analytical technique used to characterize surfaces, thin films and multilayers
 XRR, the IATA code for Ross River Airport, Yukon, Canada
 xrr, the ISO 639-3 code for Rhaetic, Eastern Alps